Andromaque was a 32-gun  frigate of the French Navy.

Career
Andromaque was commissioned in Brest in 1778 and took part in the American War of Independence. After an overhaul in which she was coppered in April 1780, she captured the British 20-gun post ship  on 4 October 1780, off Tortuga. The French Navy took Unicorn into service as La Licorne.

On 21 April 1781, Andromaque landed troops for the Siege of Pensacola, in the squadron under Monteil.

At sunset, at the mouth of the English Channel, the convoy met a British force of three 74-gun ships of the line under John Jervis; in the ensuing action of 20–21 April 1782, Pégase and the 64-gun Actionaire, armed en flûte, were captured.

Andromaque was decommissioned in November 1791 and lied in reserve at Rochefort, until June 1793, when she was armed again. Then was then tasked with convoy escort duty between Rochefort and La Rochelle, under Captain Renaudin. She had a battle against a ship of the line and four Spanish frigates.

In 1794, Andromaque cruised in the Bay of Biscay under Lieutenant Guillotin. Lieutenant Farjenel took command later that year. In 1795, she crossed the Atlantic to Guadeloupe, and Lieutenant Morel took command.

On 22 August 1796, while cruising with a naval division, she sprang a leak and has to detach. She was then chased by the frigate  and the brig  and beached herself in Arcachon Bay to avoid capture. The crew jumped overboard and swam to the shore, 20 men drowning to death. The British launched boats whose parties boarded and took prisoner Andromaques captain, Lieutenant Morel, and four officers, and rescued a number of Portuguese prisoners who had been the crews of two Brazilian ships that her squadron had captured. A boarding party from Sylph set fire to Andromaque as they left and she was completely burnt. There are reports that after seizing the entire crew, the British kept only the officers and released the seamen, only to open fire on them as they attempted to return ashore.

Notes and references

References

Bibliography 
 
 
 
 

Frigates of the Royal Navy
Ships built in France
Age of Sail frigates of France
1777 ships
Nymphe-class frigates
Maritime incidents in 1796